Avengers: Infinity War and Avengers: Endgame are American superhero films based on the Marvel Comics superhero team the Avengers, produced by Marvel Studios and distributed by Walt Disney Studios Motion Pictures. They are the sequels to Marvel's The Avengers (2012) and Avengers: Age of Ultron (2015), and serve as the 19th and 22nd films of the Marvel Cinematic Universe (MCU), respectively. Both films are directed by Anthony and Joe Russo from screenplays by the writing team of Christopher Markus and Stephen McFeely, and feature an ensemble cast composed of many previous MCU actors.

Development of the films began in Marvel Studios' early films by introducing the Infinity Stones and the Infinity Gauntlet as plot devices. Casting began in mid-2013 with Robert Downey Jr. signing on to reprise his role as Tony Stark / Iron Man, with the films officially announced a year later as Avengers: Infinity War, Part 1 and Part 2. The Russo brothers and Markus and McFeely joined the project in early 2015. In July 2016, Marvel revealed that the films were being renamed: the first part became known simply as Avengers: Infinity War, while the second part's title was revealed as Avengers: Endgame in December 2018. The films were renamed because they were intended to tell two different stories. They were designed as a conclusion to the storyline told in all the MCU films up to that point.

Both films were shot back-to-back at Pinewood Atlanta Studios in Fayette County, Georgia. Production of Infinity War began on January 23, and concluded on July 14, 2017, with additional filming in Scotland, the Downtown Atlanta area, and New York City. Filming of Avengers: Endgame began on August 10, 2017 and concluded on January 11, 2018, with additional filming in the Downtown and Metro Atlanta areas, the state of New York, Scotland, and England. They are the first Hollywood films to be shot entirely in digital IMAX, using a new camera developed alongside Arri. Industrial Light & Magic, Framestore, Method Studios, Weta Digital, DNEG, Cinesite, Digital Domain, Rise, Lola VFX, Perception, Cantina Creative, Capital T, Technicolor VFX, and Territory Studio were the visual effects companies to work on the films.

Avengers: Infinity War was released on April 27, 2018, and Avengers: Endgame was released on April 26, 2019, both part of Phase Three of the MCU.

Development

Background
Since their early films, Marvel Studios had been preparing for an adaptation of Jim Starlin's 1991 Infinity Gauntlet comic by introducing the Infinity Stones as MacGuffins: the Space Stone as the Tesseract in Captain America: The First Avenger (2011); the Mind Stone inside Loki's Scepter in The Avengers (2012); the Reality Stone as the Aether in Thor: The Dark World (2013); the Power Stone within the Orb in Guardians of the Galaxy (2014); and the Time Stone within the Eye of Agamotto in Doctor Strange (2016). According to James Gunn, writer and director of the Guardians of the Galaxy films, Marvel decided that the Aether and previous MacGuffins would be used as Infinity Stones in the films during production on The Dark World (the MacGuffins and the Infinity Stones are separate objects in the comic books). Before that decision was made, the Power Stone was presented as red in the first Guardians film and had to be changed to purple in post-production to give each of the Infinity Stones its own color since the Aether was also red.

Thanos, a comic book villain who covets the Infinity Stones, was introduced to the Marvel Cinematic Universe in a brief appearance at the end of the first Avengers film. Many fans subsequently expected Thanos to be the antagonist of the sequel, Avengers: Age of Ultron (2015). However, Joss Whedon, who wrote and directed the first two Avengers films, explained that the character would not be the primary antagonist until a later film because he is "so powerful, he is not someone you can just try to out punch. Like in the comics, you want him to be threading through the universe and to save the big finale for the big finale." Thanos appears at the end of Age of Ultron in another brief appearance, this time shown to have the Infinity Gauntlet, a glove designed to house the stones. A different Infinity Gauntlet was previously shown in the vault on Asgard in Thor (2011), but following the Age of Ultron scene this first gauntlet was revealed to be a fake in Thor: Ragnarok (2017). President of Marvel Studios Kevin Feige explained that the first gauntlet was included as a small Easter egg in Thor before an adaptation of The Infinity Gauntlet was in active development, and once Marvel had begun planning that storyline they realised that it would not make sense for the Asgardians to have the gauntlet. Marvel's internal explanation was that the first gauntlet was a fake, and Ragnarok was able to address this onscreen. The Age of Ultron gauntlet is also considered fake, with writers Christopher Markus and Stephen McFeely saying it was a "fashionable practice gauntlet".

Announcement
In July 2014, Feige stated that there were "some notions" to where Marvel would want to take a third Avengers film and that the studio was aiming for three years between Avengers: Age of Ultron in 2015 and a sequel. In October 2014, Marvel announced a two-part sequel to Age of Ultron, titled Avengers: Infinity War. Part 1 was scheduled to be released on May 4, 2018, and Part 2 was scheduled for May 3, 2019. Marvel's plan was to film both parts of Infinity War back-to-back. In January 2015, Whedon said it was "very doubtful" that he would be involved with the two films. Marvel eventually approached him about writing them, and Whedon did not rule out contributing to the screenplays in some way, but he declined to sign on as the writer for the sequels. He cited the series' increasing scale as the reason he chose not to return, explaining that each of his films had become "increasingly enormous ... [and] it's only going to get bigger with Infinity War. I'm not going to be able to give it what I would need to."

Anthony and Joe Russo had reached a deal by April 2015 to direct both parts of Avengers: Infinity War, after directing Captain America: The Winter Soldier (2014) and Captain America: Civil War (2016). A month later, writers Christopher Markus and Stephen McFeely had signed on to also return from the Captain America films, writing the screenplays for both parts of Infinity War. McFeely later recalled that the pair had started negotiating to write the two films without ever actually being asked to do so by Feige or Marvel. Anthony Russo described the two Avengers sequels as "the culmination of everything that has happened in the MCU" since Iron Man was released in 2008, bringing "an end to certain things, and in some ways... the beginning of certain things". In April 2016, Jon Favreau confirmed he would once again serve as executive producer on the films, having done so on the previous Avengers films after directing the first two Iron Man films. Gunn also served as executive producer on the two Infinity War films, working with the Russos, Marvel, and Feige "to make sure that any of the [Guardians of the Galaxy] characters I'm involved with that are in [Infinity War] are well taken care of".

In March 2018, Disney moved the United States release of the first film to April 27, 2018, which meant it would be released in the U.S. on the same weekend as several international markets. That December, the release of the second film was changed to April 26, 2019.

Titles
After announcing the titles of the films as Avengers: Infinity War, Part 1 and Part 2, Feige explained that these were chosen because of the shared elements between the films. However, he felt they would be "two distinct" films, not one story split across two films. Anthony Russo reiterated this, saying the two films were "very very different from one another. It's not a part one and part two scenario, necessarily. They're just two different expressions. I think it creates a misconception that we're shooting them at the same time." As such, in early May 2016, the Russos revealed that they would retitle the two films, to further remove this misconception.

In July 2016, Marvel announced that Part 1 would simply be known as Avengers: Infinity War, while Part 2 would be referred to as the Untitled Avengers film until a new title was chosen. Anthony Russo stated that the title of the second film would not be revealed "for quite some time", with Feige and the Russo brothers indicating the title was being withheld as it would give away plot details for Infinity War and the sequel. In April 2018, Feige stated that the title of the second film had been withheld for so long because Marvel wanted to focus on Infinity War first, since the announcement of the two films had drawn attention away from Age of Ultron which had not yet been released at that time. Feige now felt that this approach had backfired due to the discussion regarding the title getting "entirely out of hand" and generating high expectations which the actual title would not be able to live up to. That December, with the release of the second film's first trailer, the title was revealed to be Avengers: Endgame.

Writing

Process

After being hired to write the films, Markus and McFeely were told by Feige and Marvel to make two separate films rather than a two-part story. They were also asked to use Thanos and the Infinity Stones, which suggested to Markus that the Guardians of the Galaxy should likely be included in the films. They were allowed to use any characters from throughout the MCU, and could kill-off characters if they wanted to.

During the filming of Civil War in 2015, Markus and McFeely started reading comic books and writing down ideas for what could happen in the films. They ended up with 60 pages worth of unrelated ideas which Marvel went through and either highlighted or flagged as not possible. For the last four months of the year, the pair spent most of their time in a conference room with executive producer Trinh Tran as well as Feige and the Russo brothers whenever they were free. Marvel gave them baseball cards of all the MCU characters so far, and each noted whether the respective actor was available for the films. The writers began to pick potential groupings of characters, and gave these to Marvel along with their pages of ideas. McFeely referred to this stage of the process as research and development, with the pair attempting to figure out what elements Marvel and the Russos wanted to include in the films. As they came up with ideas for moments or scenes, such as a moment when Thanos uses all of the Infinity Stones, these were written on cards and placed on a timeline to allow the writers to work towards those beats. Once this was completed, Markus and McFeely compiled the cards into an initial outline that included moments, scenes, dialogue, and jokes. They re-wrote the outline to be more readable, and sent it to Marvel for approval.

The writers began work on the actual screenplays in January 2016. Each week they took the scenes from the initial outline, assigned them a page count, and took several of them each. They then individually began writing these as actual scenes in a screenplay, and would combine their work at the end of the week. This was repeated until they had a 'Frankenstein Draft' that McFeely described as long and repetitive but with some "gold" in it. The pair then worked together to read through and re-work these until they had a "functional" first draft. Completed first drafts for both films were handed to Marvel on May 1, 2016. After that, when the films were in pre-production, the pair continued to write new drafts of the screenplays. By July, they were working on the third draft of Infinity War and the second of Endgame, with Markus stating that each day they would only be working on a single film each, but they were still writing both films at the same time. In October, Thor: Ragnarok screenwriter Eric Pearson was flown from Ragnaroks set in Australia to where the Avengers films were being prepped in Atlanta so he could assist Markus and McFeely, who were "just so crammed for time". Pearson said the pair were comfortable allowing him to work on one film while they focused on the other due to his previous Marvel writing credits, including working with them on the MCU television series Agent Carter. Markus and McFeely later estimated that they had written at least 5 or 6 drafts of each film by the end of 2016. During that year, they were receiving notes on the drafts while also coming up with new ideas themselves. Markus described this process as "winnowing down and really focusing on what these movies are about".

The Russos and the writers worked with all of the other Phase Three filmmakers to keep continuity, talking "on an almost weekly basis". Doctor Strange director Scott Derrickson was "kept in the loop" on how the Avengers films use Strange through his close relationships with Feige and Joe Russo. Derrickson discussed the plot of both Avengers films with Joe, and gave notes on them, saying, "this is why this is great, this is so the way to do this... [and] no, this is why that'll never work..." Gunn wanted to ensure that the Guardians were "as funny as they should be and as honest and truthful as they should be". According to Markus, Gunn "came up with at least one hysterical riff" for the Guardians, and also chose "The Rubberband Man" by The Spinners as their opening song in Infinity War. Gunn provided insight to a choice made by Markus and McFeely for Star-Lord that both Gunn and actor Chris Pratt felt was not true to the character. The change suggested by Gunn did not alter the overall story, and McFeely felt it was a good example of how working with the other MCU filmmakers was a "bonus" for these films. Some of the biggest rewrites to the script involved Thor, since Markus and McFeely originally intended him to be the "straight man" to the Guardians. His scenes had to be revamped after Chris Hemsworth explained the more comedic direction the character was taken in Thor: Ragnarok. That film's director Taika Waititi was brought in to consult with Markus and McFeely on the new tone of Thor's character, while Pearson's involvement aided in keeping this continuity.

After the beginning of principal photography on Infinity War in January 2017, the writing process became what Markus described as "particle-ized", with multiple drafts of a single scene being written at one time between the writers and directors. Members of all the films' departments also started providing more input to screenplay revisions. On set, the writers attended rehearsals with the actors each day so they could respond to any issues with the scenes straight away, and also to provide alternative jokes for the actors to say during filming. Once filming began, they would return to revising the scenes from the screenplays that had not yet been filmed. They also coordinated with the editing team in an effort to make any rewrites as fast as possible based on footage that the editors received. This was done with the hope of being able to reshoot scenes while the actors were available and the sets still existed, where possible. The last writing the pair did for Endgame was for additional photography that took place in January 2019.

Story

While all non-Avengers films in the MCU were considered set-up for this storyline, Feige said that Black Panther (2018) would be "a very important" link to the storyline, as would Thor: Ragnarok. The Russos wanted "a strong through line" from The Winter Soldier to Civil War and into the two films, saying, "We look at [Civil War] as setting the stage for Infinity War, how it starts and what condition everybody's in." He described the concept of the films as "the Marvel universe [uniting] to battle the greatest threat to the world and universe that you've ever seen", with the brothers wanting to approach the cosmic elements of Infinity War with the same "fervor" that they gave to the more grounded films Winter Soldier and Civil War. Though they were unable to depict the films with naturalism given their science fiction content, they did want their films to have a psychological realism. Anthony added that Infinity War would deal with the "themes of fate and destiny and the essence of what it means to be a hero". Feige said the films would explore whether the visions the Avengers had in Age of Ultron were predictions of the future or just projections of their fears. Anthony described the tone of the films as unique, given how they were melding the tones of all the individual MCU franchises, and it was important for the brothers that both films were tonally different from each other as well, with different storylines and structures.

Infinity War is set approximately two years after the events of Civil War, as the Russos always set "everything based on when the last movie came out". In addition to Starlin's "Infinity Gauntlet", Markus and McFeely drew inspiration from Jonathan Hickman's "Infinity" comic (2013). Infinity War was crafted like a 1990s heist film, with the brothers looking at many films "that had that heist-style energy to them", as Infinity War "has that energy of the bad guy being one step ahead of the heroes", with Thanos "on a smash-and-grab" to acquire all of the Infinity Stones. The films 2 Days in the Valley (1996) and Out of Sight (1998) served as inspiration for the brothers.

Beyond the script used in the final film, two different drafts of Infinity War were also created. One of these drafts featured Thanos as the film's narrator, utilized a non-linear structure, and also had backstories for the Black Order members. Though this draft was not used, writing out Thanos' narration helped give Markus, McFeely, and the Russos more insight into the character. The other draft began the film after Thanos had already acquired the Power Stone, but this was rejected because "it felt like he had too many Infinity Stones to start". Going with the draft used in the final film, the plot had been "simplified, made more linear, and allowed more of the character moments come through" as the start of filming approached, giving the Russos "a very tight script" to work with. Unlike Infinity War, Avengers: Endgame features mainly an original story that does not draw inspiration from any existing comics. Joe Russo explained, "I think we're in pretty fresh territory with Avengers 4. If anything, I think it's interesting after to go back and look at some of the Marvel films and view them through a different lens. But I can't think of any comics in particular that would have value" to give a basis for the film's story. Joe Russo also described the second film as "more of an epic adventure in the classic sense, with huge emotional stakes".

While Infinity War features one post-credits scene, as with previous MCU films, the Russos considered not including one. Anthony noted that part of the reason for considering this "was because we knew the ending was a complicated ending, a difficult ending, and we wanted that ending to be very definitive. We didn't want to complicate it with other ideas." He felt the tag used, which shows Nick Fury signaling for Captain Marvel before fading away, put "a small button [on the ending] but that's it". Regarding the ending of Infinity War with Thanos wiping out half the universe, co-screenwriter Christopher Markus stated, "if you had stopped it before he snapped his fingers, or with four stones, that really is just a pause button. That really is just going, 'What's he going to do?' 'Will your hero stop dangling from the cliff?' And we wanted to put a much more definitive 'Yes, this happens. Deal with it,' tone at the end of it, rather than jerk you around."

Characters
The writers did not initially attempt to use characters in a way that would match with actor availability, instead using the characters how they wanted and then adjusting later based on scheduling constraints. Acknowledging that there are 23 characters on the Infinity War poster, McFeely stated that there was an early decision to not have "scene after scene [with] 23 people in a room moving from plot point to plot point", which would just mean that many popular actors and characters would have nothing to do in each scene. Instead, the writers wanted to divide the characters into smaller groups so that each scene could be valuable for all the characters present, and then those groups could be weaved together as required by the story.

To handle the number of characters in the films, many are split into various smaller groups early on in Infinity War, which Anthony compared to "Nashville for superheroes. It's storytelling that is vignetted storytelling. It's to composite all of them under one story—everybody." The grouping included: Iron Man, Doctor Strange, Star-Lord, Spider-Man, and initially Bruce Banner and Wong; Thor and the Guardians of the Galaxy, which ultimately split further to just Thor, Rocket, and Groot; Scarlet Witch and Vision; Thanos and Gamora; and Captain America, Black Widow, Falcon, Winter Soldier, Banner, and Black Panther. Markus said that many discussions on character pairings were about whether to pursue and further develop pre-existing relationships or to introduce new ones, with him feeling that "new pairings had the emotional level of a first date while characters that have been together before and are now in a much more dire situation and they are together again, you can really get down into the meat of their relationship."

Actor Robert Downey Jr. said in Iron Man's grouping there was a desire "to keep a little bit of the Science Bros [Stark/Banner relationship] alive" despite Banner having his own journey, and to expand on the positive Stark/Parker relationship. McFeely explained that the pairing of Strange and Stark came together because of the similarities between the characters being "guys with a vision but also an ego". To differentiate between the two, Markus and McFeely contrasted Stark's established story arc and drive to confront Thanos with Strange's more reluctant stance. Eventually adding Star-Lord provided "color" since Star-Lord also "thinks he's the smartest guy in the room ... only he isn't". A Sherlock Holmes joke was avoided when Strange first meets Stark, as the Russos felt it was "a very obvious joke" to do and "a meta joke that requires you to be a fan of other movies"; Downey portrayed Holmes in the films Sherlock Holmes (2009) and Sherlock Holmes: A Game of Shadows (2011), while Cumberbatch portrays the character in the television series Sherlock.

Thor's teaming with Rocket and Groot made "a delightful group" according to McFeely. Markus added that Rocket was considered for many other pairs, but ultimately landed with Thor because he "is so powerful that it's fun to stick Rocket next to him. Rocket does not seem to have much he could help Thor with, but it brings out new things in Rocket that you wouldn't have expected." Captain America's group continues from the events of Civil War, showing he, Black Widow, and Falcon have been on the run, in part by their different appearances (Rogers with a beard and Romanoff with blond hair). The writers also did not dwell on the romance between Romanoff and Banner, as established in Age of Ultron, beyond including a "loaded look between the two", because "it didn't serve the Thanos plotline ... There were a lot of situations we wanted to follow up, but nobody in real life would be addressing those things with Thanos coming." The relationship between Scarlet Witch and Vision was implied to have "been building and flourishing" since the events of Civil War.

Joe felt the audience would not be disappointed in the number of characters in the films, saying that "like 67 characters" who were previously introduced in the MCU had been placed out on a board for consideration. Characters were ultimately chosen based on the personal preferences of the creative team, as long as the "choices feel organic to the storytelling, and really, you have to sort of structure them in the way that they need to be there", and included some characters Joe considered to be unexpected choices such as some who made smaller appearances previously in the MCU and "are really getting fleshed out" now. Because of the number of characters, McFeely called writing Civil War "a walk in the park". He noted that characters who had not yet been cast were also in the scripts. Joe Russo explained that they intended to focus on a "handful" of characters and build the story around their emotional arcs, with many of the other characters having ancillary roles. He also said that the number of characters in Civil War prepared the brothers to "deal with probably triple the amount of characters in Infinity War", and that the characters given main focus would shift between the two films. Gunn said the Guardians of the Galaxy's roles in the films would not be the biggest part of the film, but would be integral due to their connection to Thanos.

Hope van Dyne / Wasp and Carol Danvers / Captain Marvel both only appear in the sequel, in order to preserve their debuts in Ant-Man and the Wasp (2018) and Captain Marvel (2019), respectively, which were released between Infinity War and Endgame. Other characters, such as Hawkeye and Ant-Man, were excluded in Infinity War for "a very specific story choice". Joe Russo said "we have a really interesting story cooked up for both of those characters, and part of that story required that they be under house arrest [in Infinity War]." Bringing back Red Skull was always part of the plans of Markus and McFeely, as they had Red Skull vanishing to an unknown location after holding the Tesseract at the end of Captain America: The First Avenger, in comparison to some of such film's early drafts which featured him clearly dying, like blowing him into pieces. Due to the character's history with the Infinity Stones, Red Skull was selected by the writers to return as they needed someone to be the voice of expertise when Thanos and Gamora arrived at Vormir to retrieve the Soul Stone as well due to feeling the need to confirm his survival to surprise the audience while still pushing the plot. The Russos also revealed that, despite not appearing in Infinity War, the events of the film killed Betty Ross and Sif, previously portrayed in the MCU by Liv Tyler and Jaimie Alexander, respectively. Markus and McFeely made use of time travel as a plot device to bring Gamora back in Endgame so that Gunn could use her in Guardians of the Galaxy Vol. 3 (2023) if he wished.

After announcing the films, Feige said there was a possibility that characters from Marvel Television's MCU series could appear in the team up, and actors such as Krysten Ritter, who plays Jessica Jones in the Netflix series of the same name, expressed interest in this. Anthony Russo stated that this would be "complicated" due to the television series' serial nature of storytelling and the fact that Marvel Studios and Marvel Television have separate oversight. Markus and McFeely talked about possibly including Daredevil or Luke Cage during the scenes set in New York City, but they felt that including them for quick cameos would not have satisfied the audiences. The brothers later said that "the briefest consideration" to including television characters was made, but it was "practically impossible". Joe added, "Our job is to focus on the Marvel film world and offer a satisfying climax".

Markus also talked about how he and McFeely were handling Thanos, a character that the audience knows is the threat of the films, yet until these films, had little scenes and screen time to divulge his history and motivations. He said, "We don't get an element of surprise [with his introduction]... You can count on a lot of scenes where we illuminate a lot about him very early [in the first film]", with McFeely adding, "It is incumbent upon us to give him a real story, real stakes, real personality, and a real point of view". The writers avoided the comic book storyline where Thanos tries to woo the female manifestation of Death, and instead paired him at times with Gamora, since "they had a lot of history we wanted to explore" and would add layers to Thanos that would avoid him becoming "the big mustache-twisting bad guy who wants ultimate power just to take over the world and sit on a throne". The Russos felt that the necessary time to introduce Death would be better spent on Thanos and the film's already large cast, with Anthony Russo expressing his conviction that adding a character whom the audience didn't know about and having to explain her backstory with Thanos so the audience would care about her and find her interesting didn't help to carry forward the story as it had been set out. Avoiding the Death storyline moved away from the tease Whedon used in The Avengers with the character, where Thanos felt that by challenging the Avengers, he was "courting death". Though the tease was purposely ambiguous, Whedon felt when he featured Thanos he did not know what to do with him and "kind of hung [Thanos] out to dry". Whedon added that "I love Thanos. I love his apocalyptic vision, his love affair with death. I love his power. But, I don't really understand it." Whedon enjoyed the approach the writers and Russos took in Infinity War, giving Thanos "an actual perspective and [making] him feel righteous to himself", since the Death storyline was "not a concept that will necessarily translate". After Starlin, who created Thanos, Gamora, and Drax, expressed dissatisfaction with his pay for the aforementioned characters, Disney renegotiated his agreement for Thanos' appearance in Infinity War and Endgame.

Pre-production

Casting 

In June 2013, Robert Downey Jr. signed on to return as Tony Stark / Iron Man for a third Avengers film, and Josh Brolin signed a multi-film deal the following May, to play Thanos. In July 2014, Feige stated that actors from previous MCU films were under contract to return to for a third Avengers film, with Renner stating that September he was signed on to reprise the role of Clint Barton / Hawkeye. After the announcement of Infinity War and its sequel, many established MCU actors were confirmed to be joining Downey and Brolin, including previous members of the Avengers Chris Hemsworth as Thor, Mark Ruffalo as Bruce Banner / Hulk, Chris Evans as Steve Rogers / Captain America, Scarlett Johansson as Natasha Romanoff / Black Widow, Don Cheadle as James "Rhodey" Rhodes / War Machine, Paul Bettany as Vision, Elizabeth Olsen as Wanda Maximoff / Scarlet Witch, and Anthony Mackie as Sam Wilson / Falcon. Infinity War also sees the Avengers unite with the Guardians of the Galaxy, including Chris Pratt as Peter Quill / Star-Lord, Pom Klementieff as Mantis, Karen Gillan as Nebula, Dave Bautista as Drax the Destroyer, Zoe Saldaña as Gamora, Vin Diesel as the voice of Groot, and Bradley Cooper as the voice of Rocket. Sean Gunn served as the on-set stand-in actor for Rocket on both films.

Additional actors reprising their roles in Infinity War from the various MCU franchises include Benedict Cumberbatch as Stephen Strange from Doctor Strange, with Benedict Wong as Wong; Tom Holland as Peter Parker / Spider-Man from Spider-Man: Homecoming (2017), with Jacob Batalon as Ned, Isabella Amara as Sally, Tiffany Espensen as Cindy, and Ethan Dizon as Tiny; and Chadwick Boseman as T'Challa / Black Panther from Black Panther, with Danai Gurira as Okoye, Letitia Wright as Shuri, Winston Duke as M'Baku, and Florence Kasumba as Ayo. Sebastian Stan also appears as Bucky Barnes / Winter Soldier from the Captain America films, along with Tom Hiddleston as Loki and Idris Elba as Heimdall from the Thor and Avengers films; Iron Man supporting actress Gwyneth Paltrow as Pepper Potts; Benicio del Toro as Taneleer Tivan / The Collector from Guardians of the Galaxy; William Hurt as Thaddeus Ross, who first appeared in The Incredible Hulk; and Kerry Condon as the voice of Iron Man's A.I. assistant F.R.I.D.A.Y. Samuel L. Jackson and Cobie Smulders make uncredited cameos in the post-credits scene as Nick Fury and Maria Hill, who they respectively portrayed in several previous films. Jon Favreau was to reprise his role as Harold "Happy" Hogan, while co-director Joe Russo had a cameo appearance as a paparazzi photographer, but this scene did not make the theatrical cut of the film.

In early January 2017, Peter Dinklage was in negotiations to appear in the films, and was eventually cast in the role of Eitri. At D23 Expo 2017, Marvel announced the inclusion of the "Children of Thanos", Thanos' henchmen in the film. Known collectively in the comics as the Black Order, the actors playing the characters were soon revealed to be Tom Vaughan-Lawlor as Ebony Maw, Terry Notary as Cull Obsidian, Carrie Coon as Proxima Midnight, and Michael James Shaw as Corvus Glaive. Midnight was portrayed on-set by the stuntwoman Monique Ganderton while Coon recorded her dialogue and performed motion capture for her facial expressions during post-production due to her pregnancy at the time. James Shaw had previously auditoned for M'Baku in Black Panther and was invited by Marvel to audition for Glaive in Infinity War while working on a workshop of a play by David Byrne from the Talking Heads; Shaw initially declined due to his busy schedule with other two projects, but by January 2017, his schedule cleared up and was able to participate in all three, specifically enjoying interacting with the Black Panther actors after not getting the part of M'Baku. Joe Russo explained that the Black Order was included in the film so that there were characters that the heroes "have to go through to get to" Thanos rather than have them challenge him "every step of the way". He added that Supergiant, a member of the comics version of the Black Order, was not included because "consolidation seemed like a smart thing ... they were starting to overlap each other". The Black Order in the film have altered powers which the Russos "felt were in better service of our storytelling". Emma Fuhrmann was cast as an older Cassie Lang, replacing her Ant-Man (2015) and Ant-Man and the Wasp actress Abby Ryder Fortson, in Endgame. Fuhrmann auditioned for the role in June 2017, though she at first believed that she was auditioning to play a younger Black Widow as the film was still untitled by that point; even Marvel making her audition with a fake scene as a fake character. Upon being informed of his role upon her casting, Fuhrmann sought Cassie Lang's Wikipedia page, watched all Marvel films in order and once on the set read a few comic books. Ross Marquand voices Red Skull, the "Stonekeeper" guarding the Soul Stone. Marquand replaces Hugo Weaving, who had expressed reluctance to reprise the character from The First Avenger; Weaving was approached to reprise the role, as he had originally signed for three films. However, Marvel pushed back the contracts that they agreed early on and offered him less money than he got for The First Avenger under the pretext that it would be only simple voice work. Consequently, Weaving desisted from reprising the role when he and his agent found it impossible to negotiate with the studio. Marquand, who is known for his celebrity impressions, said that Marvel was looking to "come as close to the iconic role that Hugo Weaving portrayed seven years ago and pay homage to it while also giving it a new flavor", and after Marquand attempted to "do a straight voice match to Hugo's performance", the Russo noted that the character would "sound a little different" from the last time he was seen, recommending Marquand add "this kind of ethereal almost ghost-like quality to his voice". Taking this direction, it took Marquand around 10 days to perfect the voice, which he felt melded Weaving's "iconic performance in The Matrix (1999) with the German accent he" used for the Red Skull. Red Skull was created through CGI and portrayed with stand-ins on set. By October 2017, Hiroyuki Sanada had been cast as Akihiko for Endgame, and a year later, Katherine Langford was revealed to have been cast in Endgame, also in an undisclosed role. Langford was to play the older version of Morgan Stark, who he sees in a vision after Tony's snap, but the Russos cut her scene as they felt that the scene would be too confusing. Newcomer Jack Champion was cast as the kid whom Scott Lang comes across upon his return from the Quantum Realm. Champion only had a one day shoot which he spent with Rudd, whom he felt to be one of the friendly actors he has worked with due to how they spent that whole day together. Reginald VelJohnson was cast as a fire chief for an Endgame scene which took a week to film in Atlanta after the Russos contacted his agent due to being fans of his work; VelJohnson's scene was not kept in the theatrical cut of the film, but was later included when the film was re-released in theaters with bonus content.

Actors who returned for Endgame include: Downey, Hemsworth, Ruffalo, Evans, Johansson, Cumberbatch, Cheadle, Holland, Boseman, Olsen, Mackie, Stan, Hiddleston, Wong, Klementieff, Gillan, Bautista, Saldana, Cooper, Paltrow, Brolin, Pratt, and Wright. Olsen was not contractually obliged to return due to Infinity War fulfilling her original three-film contract with Marvel, but Feige persuaded her to return in Endgame by pitching her the concept of the then upcoming Disney+ series WandaVision. They were joined by Jeremy Renner as Clint Barton, Evangeline Lilly as Hope van Dyne, Favreau as Happy Hogan, Paul Rudd as Scott Lang, Brie Larson as Carol Danvers, Michelle Pfeiffer as Janet van Dyne, Michael Douglas as Hank Pym, and Frank Grillo as Brock Rumlow / Crossbones. Grillo initially turned down the offer to return, as he had grown dissatisfied with how his character had been handled in the MCU in spite his initial seven-picture deal, even hanging up at the Russos when they called him to ask if he could come for a week to the Avengers set without specifying him what he would do, but ultimately agreed to return at the insistence of his son, who reminded him how well he had felt in the sets of The Winter Soldier and Civil War in addition to assuring him that Endgame would be the "biggest movie" in the world. Vaughan-Lawlor, Notary, Ganderton and Shaw reprised their roles as the "Children of Thanos" from Infinity War respectively; Coon was unable to reprise her role as Proxima Midnight due to a scheduling conflict, so Ganderton played the role solely and the character was given a non-speaking part with no close-ups. Ty Simpkins reprised his Iron Man 3 (2013) role as Harley Keener; Sympkins was called by his manager, who told him that Marvel Studios was considering to bring him back, which Marvel confirmed to him in a later call, though Simpkins chose not to tell his family at first as he wasn't sure he would be appearing in the film. Stellan Skarsgård, who portrays Erik Selvig in the MCU, said he believed he would appear in one of the films as he had one more film left on his contract, and would not be appearing in Thor: Ragnarok. Despite having declared to be "done" with the franchise after Thor: The Dark World, Natalie Portman reprised her role as Jane Foster from the Thor films for the 2013 sequence; Portman's reprisal was achieved through archive footage from The Dark World to physically represent the character while Portman recorded a single line of dialogue new for the film. For the 1970 sequence, James D'Arcy reprised his role as Edwin Jarvis from Agent Carter, marking the first time a character introduced in an MCU television series appears in an MCU film. Reed Diamond, who appeared as Hydra member Werner Reinhardt / Daniel Whitehall in the MCU series Agents of S.H.I.E.L.D., had been approached by Marvel Studios regarding his availability for Endgame, with visual effects company Cantina Creative eventually using a photo of Whitehall in imagery for the film's time heist information screens, which was ultimately cut. The imagery would have also featured the likelenesses of previous MCU actors such as Erich Redman as Schneider, Toby Jones as Arnim Zola, Thomas Kretschmann as Baron Wolfgang von Strucker and Claudia Kim as Helen Cho.

The Russos hoped to have another actor from their TV series Community make a cameo appearance, after Danny Pudi and Jim Rash appeared in The Winter Soldier and Civil War, respectively. David Cross was invited to make a cameo appearance as Tobias Fünke in Infinity War, his character from the sitcom Arrested Development, which the Russo brothers had previously worked on; this was prevented by a scheduling conflict, but Fünke still appears in the film as a specimen in the Collector's collection, played by an uncredited extra. Ultimately, Yvette Nicole Brown and Ken Jeong, who played Shirley Bennett and Ben Chang in Community, appeared in Endgame as a Camp Lehigh agent and a security guard respectively. Jeong was also at one point going to voice Howard the Duck, replacing his Guardians of the Galaxy actor Seth Green, in Infinity War before the Russos decided that his inclusion didn't fit the movie. Green was unaware of Howard's appearance in Endgame until he saw the film. Avengers co-creator Stan Lee makes cameo appearances in both films. Starlin indicated he was interested in making cameo appearance in the films, appearing in Endgame.

Design
Production designer Charles Wood previously worked on Thor: The Dark World, Guardians of the Galaxy, Age of Ultron, and Doctor Strange, but found the increase in scale with Infinity War and Endgame to be a particular challenge. He felt that revisiting the sets of Doctor Strange in Infinity War was particularly helped by his experience on the original film, allowing for continuity between the two films. For the nation of Wakanda from Black Panther, that film was being produced in Atlanta at the same time as Infinity War so Wood and his team worked with the Black Panther production team to ensure a unified presentation of the country.

In January 2017, Wood stated that the two films would be introducing "many, many,  new worlds" outside of Earth and others previously established in prior films. When designing Thanos's homeworld Titan, Wood intentionally wanted it to be as different from Wakanda as possible so the audience would not be confused when Infinity War cuts between both locations. The design process for Titan started by designing what it looked like in Thanos's youth, with structures inspired by windmills forming the basic shapes of the planet's buildings. The team then designed the post-apocalyptic version of Titan that is seen in the film. An early idea was to film these scenes on location in the Atacama Desert in Chile, and though this idea was abandoned the look of the planet was still inspired by that location. The production design team also looked at icebergs in Antarctica while trying to depict the structures on Titan falling apart in low gravity. Sand dunes in the Atacama Desert were also used as inspiration for the planet of Vormir, though the focus of the design of that planet was making the clouds look unnatural to give the sky a dream-like quality. The location of Nidavellir took more inspiration from the comic books.

Costume designer Judianna Makovsky focused on making clothes that fit the realistic style of the Russo brothers. For the civilian clothes worn early in Endgame, Makovsky wanted to adjust the color palette to be less bright than previous films to not draw away from the characters and storyline. The clothes worn by a depressed Thor were meant to still evoke his traditional costume, such as a bathrobe in the same red as his cape. For the digital characters in the films, Makovsky created clothes for small maquettes of the characters which the visual effects team could then replicate. The time travel suits in Endgame were designed by Marvel's head of visual development Ryan Meinerding to be a mixture of Ant-Man, Iron Man, and Guardians of the Galaxy technology. Because of how busy the costume team was during production, the time travel suits were never actually made for the film. Instead, after the design was finalized, the suits were created digitally. Wood designed the time travel devices worn on the heroes' wrists. The company Perception helped the production team visualize their concept of time travel in the film, focusing "on the mechanics of how it might work, what it might look like, and how you would explain it". The team at Perception also explored "ideas surrounding scientific considerations, technology-based concepts, and potential narrative influences".

Originally, three separate War Machine suits would appear in Endgame: the repaired Mark III from Captain America: Civil War, the Mark IV used throughout Morag before dissolving in acidic water in an underwater sequence, and the Mark V, dubbed the "cosmic War Machine armor", for space use. Ultimately, the Mark III armor and underwater sequence were cut, and Rhodes uses the Mark VI on Morag during the attack on Avengers HQ and the Mark VII "Iron Patriot" suit for the final battle.

Filming plan
The films were originally scheduled to be shot concurrently, with the Russos suggesting that "some days we'll be shooting the first movie and some days we'll be shooting the second movie. Just jumping back and forth." Anthony Russo felt it made more sense to shoot the films simultaneously, due to financial and logistical reasons, considering the large number of cast members, even though each part is its own distinct film. At the end of April 2015, Evans revealed that filming was scheduled to start in late 2016 and take place over nine months, lasting until August or September 2017. In January 2016, the Russos stated that filming would take place in Atlanta, Georgia, beginning in November 2016 and lasting until June 2017. In October, Feige stated that filming would begin in January 2017.

Renner, Olsen and Bautista noted that the actors appearing in the films had not received scripts before the start of shooting, with Bautista specifically stating on January 22, 2017, that he had not received a script, despite beginning his filming on January 23. No actor in Infinity War had the entire script, though some who were in the film had access to more scenes than others. Additionally, fake and redacted scenes were used to help protect the secrecy surrounding the film. According to Olsen, the actors could only read the script on one specific iPad inside an office accompanied by a security guard. In April 2017, Feige revealed that the sequels were no longer being filmed simultaneously as originally planned, but rather back-to-back, and indicated that filming for the Infinity War sequel would commence in August 2017. He explained, "We're doing them one right after another. It became too complicated to cross-board them like that, and we found ourselves—again, something would always pay the price. We wanted to be able to focus and shoot one movie and then focus and shoot another movie." As this decision was made a few months before the start of filming, some of the pre-production work was negatively affected. Some scenes from both films did ultimately get shot on the same day, mainly to accommodate actor availability.

Filming

Principal photography

Principal photography for Infinity War began on January 23, 2017, at Pinewood Atlanta Studios in Fayette County, Georgia. The working title Mary Lou was used as a reference to gymnast Mary Lou Retton, because the production wanted to "stick the landing" with the two films as an ending for the MCU. Pinewood Atlanta co-owner Dan T. Cathy described the films as "the largest film production ever with a [combined] $1 billion budget", which Feige stated was false; the first film had an estimated budget of $325–400 million, still making it one of the most expensive films ever made. Evans and Hemsworth earned $15 million each for both films.

Additional filming occurred in Scotland, including in Edinburgh, Glasgow, and the Scottish Highlands, with studio work taking place at Wardpark Studios in Cumbernauld. Filming in Scotland began on February 28, 2017. From March 18 through April 21, 2017, filming occurred in Old Town, Edinburgh on and around the Royal Mile, including High Street, Parliament Square, Cockburn Street, and Roxburgh Close and Old Fishmarket Close, as well as Waverley Station. Filming also took place at Durham Cathedral in Durham, England in early May 2017, and in St Abbs. These scenes were actually shot for Endgame, with Durham Cathedral portraying 2013 Asgard, and St Abbs doubling for the town of New Asgard in Norway. Filming also occurred at St Giles' Cathedral and Inverness Castle. Other scenes shot for Endgame in 2017 were that of 1970 Camp Lehigh and the 2012 Loki escaping with the Tesseract from the Stark Tower. In late June 2017, filming occurred in Downtown Atlanta, as well as Atlanta's Central Park in early July, before moving to Queens, New York in the middle of the month. For Infinity Wars final scene, the filmmakers partnered with Indochina Productions, a studio based in Thailand, to acquire footage of the Banaue Rice Terraces at Ifugao, Philippines. Filming of Infinity War concluded on July 14, 2017. The actors whose characters perished from Thanos' snap were shown previsualization of the scene of the day it was being filmed, which was the first time they had been aware of their characters' fates.

Filming on Endgame began on August 10, 2017, also at Pinewood Atlanta Studios, under the working title Mary Lou 2; the second film had an estimated budget of $356–400 million. In August, filming occurred in The Gulch area of Downtown Atlanta, near the Five Points MARTA station, as well as in Piedmont Park. Throughout the shooting, some actors were kept in the dark about the film's plot; Champion recalled that when he and Rudd filmed their scene together, the missing posters seen in the finished film were absent from the pole they were, making his confusing reaction to Scott Lang's question genuine. Further filming locations in the Atlanta area included a lakeside cabin in Fairburn, Georgia, which is where the Stark family live in the film, as well as several locations that were used to portray Avengers Compound: the Porsche Experience Center in Atlanta, and an empty conference room in a semi-abandoned Sheraton Hotel near Atlanta Airport. Production on Endgame wrapped on January 11, 2018.

Cinematography
Trent Opaloch served as director of photography for the two films. Ahead of filming, the Russo brothers announced that both films would be shot using Arri Alexa IMAX cameras, the first time that a Hollywood feature film was shot entirely with IMAX digital cameras. The footage was digitally processed by IMAX and released in a 1.90:1 aspect ratio exclusively in IMAX theaters. Joe Russo said that because many of the characters are tall, the "IMAX aspect ratio works for those types of characters, and the landscapes are stunning. There are some really exotic landscapes in the film, and to be able to put those on an IMAX screen, it's an incredible tool to have as a filmmaker to be able to exploit that scale of aspect ratio." Opaloch noted that the production would use 12 of the Arri Alexa IMAX cameras, and that Arri was working on lenses with additional focal lengths for the camera. They hoped they would be available by the start of filming, since the production would "need all the accessories and lenses", as it was "such a behemoth of a project".

Infinity War was shot mostly with a single-camera setup, opposed to the three-camera setup used by the Russos on the Captain America films. The Russos went with this approach to make Infinity War "look bigger" over "the vérité look" the Captain America films had with three cameras. Opaloch described his visual style as more focused on the needs of each scene rather than an overall visual look for the films. For the scenes in Endgame that were recreating moments from previous films, Opaloch started by trying to replicate the work of the cinematographers on those earlier films, but then moved where the new scenes required him to. Approximately 890 hours of footage was shot between both films.

Post-production 
Post-production for Endgame began in earnest after the release of Infinity War, with Feige explaining that the second film would have a slightly longer time in post-production than some of Marvel's other films. Joe Russo ultimately felt that Endgame was his and his brother's "best work for Marvel", and felt that because the majority of the film was made before Infinity War was released and the audience was able to respond to it, the sequel was "really pure... without any sort of external noise creeping in" to the story.

Editing 

Jeffrey Ford and Matthew Schmidt served as editors for Infinity War and Endgame. Ford's process was to watch through dailies as they came in from set in the order they were filmed, to see the progression of the actors performances. He would put together an early cut of the footage the day it was filmed, and then return to that cut at least several hours later if not the next day. Ford would then share his cuts with the Russo brothers on set, and when possible would sit with the directors when they weren't busy filming to go through footage up to that point. Due to the many visual effects required for the films, Ford worked with Gerardo Ramirez of The Third Floor to include previsualized sequences in the early cuts, as well as postvisualizing by adding basic effects such as backgrounds to the dailies. Ford also worked with Shannon Mills from Skywalker Sound to add early sound to his rough cuts.

Ford stated there was "a pretty solid cut" of Infinity War by October 2017, but the film was constantly being edited and restructured until very late in the process "until it sort of clicked in". Ford explained that the restructuring was focused on adjusting the rhythm of the film where the hand-offs between characters and storylines take place. This was important to get the pace of the film right, as early versions of the film were shorter than the final two-and-a-half hour runtime but felt slower when shown in test screenings. During filming, both editors worked on compiling the material from both films as it was given to them. Around December 2017, Ford began working exclusively on the edit for Infinity War, while Schmidt continued compiling the Endgame footage. Of his work on Infinity War, Ford was most proud of how he shaped the actors performances. Ford noted that the Avengers films are largely character-driven, with the action sequences involving a large amount of character moments. He had to work with several motion capture performances with the film, but Ford was able to cut these performances just as he would a traditional performance because the motion capture actors were on set with the other actors, and the visual effects team ensured the actors all had the correct eye-lines to match the characters that would be added digitally.

Once Infinity War was preparing for release, both Ford and Schmidt began "working in earnest" on Endgame, with editing beginning a few weeks before the release of Ant-Man and the Wasp in July 2018. Tia Nolan, Peter S. Elliot, and Craig Tanner all served as guest editors on Endgame to help Ford and Schmidt complete the film on time. In early November 2018, the Russo brothers said they were "about halfway through" editing the film. Ford described Endgame as "less editorially driven" than the previous Marvel films he had worked on, including Infinity War, with the mise-en-scène style of the sequel driven more by the blocking of the actors and camera on set than the editors' direction. Several shots in the film had to be stitched together by the editors and visual effects team from different pieces filmed at different times during production, including an action scene with Hawkeye in Tokyo that is shown as a single long take but was actually filmed in three or four different sections on a street in Atlanta. Because Silvestri was unable to work on the score for Endgame until long after editing had begun for the film due to other commitments, Ford and his team used music from Silvestri's previous scores (including the previous Avengers films) as part of a temp score. In March 2019, the Russos confirmed that the final film edit for Endgame was locked.

Additional photography 
Joe Russo stated in July 2017 that there were a couple of unfinished scenes for Infinity War that would be shot "in the next few months". In March 2018, Marvel approached the Hudson Valley Film Commission about finding a location to film an Endgame battlefield in upstate New York. The commission suggested eight different properties, and Marvel chose the Staatsburgh State Historic Site in Dutchess County. The property was filmed over several days in June 2018, to get footage for the visual effects team. The Black Creek Preserve in nearby Ulster County was also filmed. Visual effect plates for Endgame were also filmed in Tokyo and Brazil, the latter for portraying an alien planet.

The Russos revealed on September 7, 2018, that main additional photography for Endgame had begun with the cast returning to the Atlanta set. This was completed on October 12. Due to the amount of filming that was required for these reshoots, the production split into four units with the Russo brothers taking one each and the other two being supervised by visual effects supervisor Dan Deleeuw and Ford, respectively. Ruffalo indicated that beyond reshooting material, the additional photography would be used to finish the film since it had not been fully completed earlier in the year. Markus and McFeely described the additional photography as mostly adding things that they did not realize they needed, as well as a few things that they knew they needed but had been unable to film until then. Ford explained that these reshoots covered many parts of Endgame, including completing the final battle sequence. An important change was adjusting the presentation of the two versions of Nebula in the film, as it was easy to tell the two apart in the script by their labels "Good Nebula" and "Bad Nebula" but on screen it was less clear which was which. Another major change made through reshoots was altering the scene in which Black Widow dies: originally the scene featured Black Widow and Hawkeye fighting Thanos and his forces, but in post-production the antagonists were removed from the scene. One year after filming her scenes, Tilda Swinton was brought back for reshoots. Some key time-travel plot points had changed, leading to the inclusion of the scene where the Ancient One shows Hulk a visual timeline to explain to him the consequences if their mission fails.

Some final reshoots for Endgame occurred in January 2019, including the climax of Endgame where Tony Stark uses the Infinity Stones. Originally this scene did not have any dialogue for Thanos or Stark, but the line "I am inevitable" was added to Thanos to complete that character's arc in the film, which is about his sense of destiny. During editing, the directors decided that it was out of character for Stark not to say something back, and Ford suggested the line "I am Iron Man" as a callback to the first Iron Man film. Adding this line was a significant reason for the January 2019 reshoots, which took place at Raleigh Studios, California, where Downey first screen tested for Iron Man. At first, Downey Jr. didn't want to return just to shoot the "I am Iron Man" line, but Feige and the Russos convinced him that the line was necessary to the film's story after the Russos realized during editing how to improve the storytelling.

Visual effects 

Visual effects for Infinity War were created by Industrial Light & Magic (ILM), Framestore, Method Studios, Weta Digital, DNEG, Cinesite, Digital Domain, Rise, Lola VFX, and Perception. The main title sequence was created by Perception. Sequences from the film for the visual effects vendors were given to them beginning in February 2017. Digital Domain worked on creating Thanos for the film, producing over 400 visual effects shots. The company created a new facial capture application called Masquerade, based on the concept of machine learning through computer algorithms, specifically for the film, beginning work on the system 3–4 months before filming began to develop and test it. They presented their results to Brolin, the Russos, and executives from Marvel ahead of filming to demonstrate the subtleties Brolin would be able to bring to the character, which helped inform Brolin how to portray the character. Before the start of filming, Brolin's facial expressions were captured with ILM's Medusa system, which along with his motion capture data from set, were fed to Masquerade to "create a higher-resolution version of what Brolin did on set" so animators could apply that to the CGI character. Kelly Port, Digital Domain's VFX Supervisor, noted the design of Thanos took into account the versions that appeared in previous films, but were adjusted more toward's Brolin's features, which also helped with matching his performance to the digital character. Weta Digital worked on the fight on Titan, where they also created a separate version of Thanos for their needs, applying the performance capture data to the tools Weta developed for their work on the 2010s Planet of the Apes series. Weta worked on 200 shots of him, along with their 250 other effects shots, that included the Titan environment and the other characters in the fight. Digital Domain also created Red Skull, and was aided by reference material from Captain America: The First Avenger to create the CGI character. Port noted there was "a wide spectrum of designs in terms of what he would look like", with some options including having Hugo Weaving reprise the role with makeup, had he returned, and a version "where the Tesseract did very bad things to his appearance, so he was much more skeletal." The final character design was "in between", one that "showed both that the Tesseract did affect him and choose him in some kind of way to be" the guardian of the Soul Stone.

Framestore created 253 shots for the film for the New York fight sequence in the first act of the film. Patric Roos, Framestore's VFX Supervisor, called their shots a "mix of full CG shots, plate shots, FX, set extensions, magic spells and a lot of character work". A portion of the fight sequence was shot in Atlanta, before moving to a fully CGI Washington Square Park. Framestore's Capture Lab spent a month in Manhattan and New Jersey shooting photo reference, LIDAR and gigapixel panoramas to capture the environments that had to be recreated digitally, capturing more than 250,000 photos and 15TB of data. For their work on the Black Order members, Framestore spent close to a year developing their models, working with Marvel Studios' visual development team to create animation vignettes to explore each member's personalities and character traits. Framestore also created Iron Man's new suit, the Mark 50, that is made up of singular nanobots which move around his body to form a suit, and was developed alongside Marvel for about two years, and Spider-Man's Iron Spider armor suit. The models and textures for the Iron Spider suit were shared with fellow visual effects vendor Trixer in order for them to implement them in Spider-Man: Homecoming where it was first seen. Framestore also worked on the Black Order's Q-Ship, and Doctor Strange's "Eldritch magic", which was updated from its first appearance in Doctor Strange. Cinesite's work on the interior of the Q-Ship when Ebony Maw interrogates Strange consisted of 215 shots. The company also worked on the small fight between Iron Man, Spider-Man, Strange and the Guardians on the ship, which required full character animation, blaster and web effects, CGI daggers, Star-Lord's mask, Mantis' antennae, and damage to the Q-Ship. The post-credit sequence, the opening scene in Central Park, the scene when Black Panther presents Bucky Barnes with his new arm, interior shots of the Quinjet, and an establishing shot of the planet Vormir were created by Rise, which totaled 26 shots. For the post-credit sequence, Oliver Schulz, Rise's VFX Supervisor, noted the company had done a similar fading effect for a previous commercial project, so those assets were used as a baseline. The company also received digital assets of Cobie Smulders and Samuel L. Jackson from The Winter Soldier for use in the scene. Schulz noted that part of the sequence's difficulty was because "at a later point in the process the decision was made to not move forward with the filmed plate of Nick Fury—instead we would do a camera takeover and switch to a full CG shot. This included a full CG arm crumbling away in close-up together with a full CG environment. Additionally were also the CG close-up pavement and the all CG pager—which reveals the illuminated Captain Marvel Logo at the end."

Visual effects for Endgame were created by ILM, Weta Digital, DNEG, Framestore, Cinesite, Digital Domain, Rise, Lola VFX, Cantina Creative, Capital T, Technicolor VFX, and Territory Studio. The film has over 3,000 visual effects shots. Perception worked on the main-on-end credits, opting to create "something that felt personal [and] sentimental", that would also remind the viewer of "the last ten years" of the MCU and was "a love letter to the fans". The credits were broken down into three sections–the crew, the cast, and then the "hero 6" which featured the original six Avengers from the first film–and featured over 60 unique title cards. Unlike traditional credit order, Marvel Studios wanted the credits to build to the original Avengers, which meant putting the top billed actors at the end of the sequence instead of the start. Perception used abstract light rays that became more distinct as the sequence progressed. For the cast credits, footage from past films was used for each actor, "specifically selected not just for the way it interacted with the light but also for its iconic power". Finally, the hero section featured an image of the actor in the foreground with footage of their character in the background as well as the actor's signature. Featuring the signatures was an idea from Feige to create "a more personal and intimate connection". Perception once again created the main title sequence as well.

As with previous MCU films, Lola worked on the de-aging sequences; Endgame features 200 de-aging and aging shots. Downey, Evans, Ruffalo, Hemsworth, Johansson, and Renner were de-aged to their 2012 appearances for scenes recreated from The Avengers (2012). Michael Douglas, John Slattery, and Stan Lee were also de-aged for the 1970 New Jersey sequence; Douglas' appearance in The Streets of San Francisco was referenced. Lola also aged-up Evans for the final scene where he is portrayed as an elderly man, using some makeup and a stand-in as reference. Anthony Mackie recalled that for the climactic scene with an aged Steve Rogers, the filmmakers initially had "wanted to cast an old dude to play Chris Evans. So they brought in, like, three actors. They're, like, none of these [is] how Chris will look when he's old. ... He's going to be 95 and still handsome, you know? So they brought in a makeup team and prosthetics and made [Evans] into an old man." Much of the Evans additionally came from CGI, visual effects supervisor Dan Deleeuw said, explaining the scene was shot with Evans and "an older-age double. You have [the double play] the scene watching Chris running the scene the same way. And so, when you have Chris' performance and kind of a reference for the older skin, you’re able to basically marry [and] take the texture from the older skin and apply it to Chris Evans with some combination of CG and painting mixed in.

One of the last VFX additions to the film was a quick cameo of Howard the Duck during the Battle of Earth sequence; the character wasn't meant to appear in the finished film, but Joe Russo requested to include him while checking the portal effects. The VFX team was able to include Howard despite being at just three days of finishing all VFX shots. There were also talks to digitally insert Cassie Lang in the funeral sequence as a guest, because she wasn't included in the original filmed version, but the filmmakers desisted after realizing that the attendants were honoring Tony Stark's sacrifice and that her inclusion wasn't necessary.

Music

Alan Silvestri, who composed the score for The Avengers, was revealed in June 2016 to be returning to score both Infinity War and Endgame. Silvestri started to record his score for Infinity War in January 2018, and concluded in late March. In early November 2018, the Russos had started to work with Silvestri on the score for Endgame, and scoring for the second film concluded in late March 2019. The films' scores were recorded at Abbey Road Studios in London with the London Symphony Orchestra.

Notes

References 

Avengers: Infinity War and Avengers: Endgame
Avengers: Infinity War and Avengers: Endgame
Avengers (film series)
Avengers: Infinity War and Avengers: Endgame
Marvel Cinematic Universe: Phase Three